Nerijus is a Lithuanian masculine given name.

People named Nerijus include:

Nerijus Astrauskas (born  1980),  football striker who plays for FK Žalgiris Vilnius in the Lithuanian A Lyga 
Nerijus Barasa (born 1978),  Lithuanian footballer,  right-back or defensive 
Nerijus Numavičius (born 1967),  Lithuanian businessman, chairman and president of VP Group
Nerijus Radžius (born  1976), Lithuanian footballer, currently playing for Sūduva Marijampolė 
Nerijus Valskis (born 1987), Lithuanian footballer 
Nerijus Vasiliauskas (born  1977),  Lithuanian footballer, who plays in Estonian Meistriliiga

Masculine given names
Lithuanian masculine given names